Þórólfur Árnason is an Icelandic businessman and politician, who served as Mayor of Reykjavík from 1 February 2003 to 30 November 2004. He replaced Ingibjörg Sólrún Gísladóttir after the Left Greens and the Progressive Party had demanded that she resign. His appointment as mayor was a compromise between the three parties that formed the majority of the city council. Having never been involved in politics before, but a well-known executive for some of Iceland's largest companies, Þórólfur was considered a "mayor-for-hire" by the council – a manager of day-to-day city affairs rather than a political leader or policymaker.

He resigned on 30 November 2004 after a controversy regarding Icelandic oil companies' breach of competition law, as he had formerly held a managerial position in one of the companies.

After Þórólfur's time as mayor, he became chief executive of Icelandic Group in May 2005.

References

External links
 biography

Living people
Year of birth missing (living people)
Thorolfur Arnason